John Wainwright C.B. was an officer in the Royal Navy.

In 1806, he became captain of the frigate HMS Chiffonne and, in 1809, was the commodore of a squadron sent to suppress pirates in the Persian Gulf.

After having led that joint-services expedition to ‘burn the Pirates out of the Gulf’, he was awarded a scimitar by a grateful emir and a gift ‘for plate’ by the Honourable East India Company.  In recompense for the period without the opportunity to capture prizes, he was invited to escort on Chiffonne the 1810 Trade fleet from India to China, involving a lucrative ‘freight’ fee.

In 1814, he captained Admiral Cochrane's flagship, and saw action against the Chesapeake Bay Flotilla of Joshua Barney in the War of 1812., and subsequently landed some of the Marines who later helped burn Washington.

In 1819, he became lieutenant governor of the Royal Naval College in Portsmouth but died within ten days.

See also
British Warships in the Age of Sail

References

Companions of the Order of the Bath
Royal Navy personnel of the War of 1812
1819 deaths